The Women's sprint at the 2014 Commonwealth Games, as part of the cycling programme, took place on 26 and 27 July 2014.

Results

Qualification

Quarter-finals

Semi-finals

5th–8th Places

Finals

References

Women's sprint
Women's sprint (track cycling)
Cycling at the Commonwealth Games – Women's sprint
Comm